Noélie Ditchakou Yarigo (born 26 December 1985) is a middle-distance runner from Benin who competes primarily in the 800 metres. She represented her country at the 2016 Rio and 2020 Tokyo Olympics. Yarigo holds five Beninese national records including at 800 m indoors and out.

She serves with the Benin Air Force. She was given leave to prepare for the 2016 Olympics, and used it to train in France at the club run by the wife of her coach.

On 8 February 2023, at age 37, Yarigo set a significant personal best in the 800 m as she clocked 1:58.48 for second at the indoor Copernicus Cup in Toruń, Poland. Her previous best was 1:59.12, set outdoors in 2016.

Competition record

Personal bests
 400 metres – 53.20 (Ouagadougou 2017)
 400 metres indoor – 55.11 (Bordeaux 2014) 
 800 metres – 1:59.12 (Rio de Janeiro 2016) 
 800 metres indoor – 1:58.48 (Toruń 2023) 
 1000 metres – 2:36.30 (Heusden-Zolder 2021) 
 1500 metres – 4:20.09 (Blois 2018)

References

External links
 

1985 births
Living people
People from Atakora Department
Beninese female middle-distance runners
World Athletics Championships athletes for Benin
Place of birth missing (living people)
Athletes (track and field) at the 2016 Summer Olympics
Olympic athletes of Benin
Beninese military personnel
Athletes (track and field) at the 2019 African Games
African Games competitors for Benin
Athletes (track and field) at the 2020 Summer Olympics